Song Sang-hyeon Square (also known as Song Sang-hyeon Plaza) is a public open space on Jungang-daero Avenue, Busanjin-gu in Busan, Republic of Korea, Korea's largest square. Building began in 2012; in October 2013, the construction site was expanded; in June 2014 construction was completed, and the area was officially opened. [1] In April 2012, a competition was announced on the choice of name for the area. In November 2012, the square was named Song Sang-hyeon, the national war hero during the Japanese invasions of Korea against the Japanese.

Busanjin District
Squares in South Korea
Tourist attractions in Busan
2014 establishments in South Korea